Christian Mayrleb (born 8 June 1972) is an Austrian retired professional footballer who is employed as the manager of Austrian side ASKÖ Donau Linz.

Club career
Born in Wels, Upper Austria, Mayrleb started his professional career at Second Division side Stahl Linz and SV Ried before joining Austrian Bundesliga outfit Admira/Wacker at the start of the 1994–95 season. He then played for FC Tirol Innsbruck where he was snapped up by English Premier League club Sheffield Wednesday, only to return to Austria after half a season on the subs' bench.

He moved to Vienna club Austria Vienna for a prolific four years before moving on to play for SV Pasching, Red Bull Salzburg and ending up in Linz again with LASK Linz.

In November 2006 Mayrleb failed a drug test but was cleared by a League disciplinary panel because no evidence was found he was taking performance-enhancing drugs.

International career
Mayrleb made his debut for the Austria national team in an August 1998 friendly match against France and came on as a substitute in his first six matches for the national team. He scored his first goal two months after his debut game. He earned 29 caps, scoring six goals. His last international was a September 2005 World Cup qualification match against Azerbaijan.

Honours
Individual
 Austrian Bundesliga top scorer: 2004–05

References

External links

Profile - Austria Archive

1972 births
Living people
People from Wels
Association football forwards
Austrian footballers
Austrian expatriate footballers
Austria international footballers
SV Ried players
FC Admira Wacker Mödling players
FC Tirol Innsbruck players
Sheffield Wednesday F.C. players
FK Austria Wien players
FC Red Bull Salzburg players
LASK players
FC Juniors OÖ players
Austrian Football Bundesliga players
Premier League players
Expatriate footballers in England
Austrian expatriate sportspeople in England
Footballers from Upper Austria